The 2023 Open Sud de France was a men's tennis tournament played on indoor hard courts. It was the 36th edition of the Open Sud de France, and part of the ATP Tour 250 series of the 2023 ATP Tour. It took place at the Arena Montpellier in Montpellier, France, from 6 February until 12 February 2023. Second-seeded Jannik Sinner won the singles title.

Finals

Singles 

  Jannik Sinner def.  Maxime Cressy, 7–6(7–3), 6–3

Doubles 

  Robin Haase /  Matwé Middelkoop def.  Maxime Cressy /  Albano Olivetti, 7–6(7–4), 4–6, [10–6]

Point and prize money

Point distribution

Prize money 

*per team

Singles main draw entrants

Seeds 

1 Rankings are as of 30 January 2022.

Other entrants 
The following players received wildcards into the singles main draw :
  Arthur Fils
  Ugo Humbert 
  Luca Van Assche 

The following players received entry from the qualifying draw:
  Antoine Bellier 
  Geoffrey Blancaneaux 
  Clément Chidekh
  Luca Nardi

Withdrawals 
  Pablo Carreño Busta → replaced by  Grégoire Barrère 
  Grigor Dimitrov → replaced by  Mikael Ymer 
  Botic van de Zandschulp → replaced by  Nikoloz Basilashvili

Doubles main draw entrants

Seeds 

1 Rankings are as of 30 January 2022.

Other entrants 
The following pairs received wildcards into the doubles main draw:
  Maxime Cressy /  Albano Olivetti 
  Arthur Fils /  Luca Van Assche

The following pair received entry as alternates:
  Théo Arribagé /  Luca Sanchez

Withdrawals 
  Maxime Cressy /  Albano Olivetti → replaced by  Patrik Niklas-Salminen /  Emil Ruusuvuori 
  Matthew Ebden /  Hugo Nys → replaced by  Sriram Balaji /  Jeevan Nedunchezhiyan 
  Lloyd Glasspool /  Harri Heliövaara → replaced by  Manuel Guinard /  Fabrice Martin 
  Pierre-Hugues Herbert /  Nicolas Mahut → replaced by  Théo Arribagé /  Luca Sanchez
  Raven Klaasen /  Aisam-ul-Haq Qureshi → replaced by  Fabian Fallert /  Hendrik Jebens

References

External links 
 

2023 ATP Tour
2023 in French tennis
2023
February 2023 sports events in France